So Fresh is an Australian compilation album series. It began in 2000, as a joint venture from Sony, BMG (later merged into Sony) and Universal, replacing the prior Hit Machine series, which ran from 1993 to 2000. Since 2000, So Fresh albums have been released four times per year, named after each season (Summer, Autumn, Winter and Spring), consisting of current hit songs from artists signed to Sony, BMG or Universal.

So Fresh albums have been highly successful in Australia. Every edition from Spring 2000 to Winter 2016 was certified at least platinum (for over 70,000 copies shipped or sold), and every year from 2001–2011, 2014–2015 and 2017–2022, the year's highest selling compilation in Australia has been a So Fresh album. As of Summer 2023, all 90 seasonal So Fresh albums have reached number one on the ARIA Compilations Chart.

Various other So Fresh spin-off albums have also been released, including an annual Christmas compilation each year from 2002 to 2019, and several DVD releases. From September 2003 until approximately November 2006, So Fresh also ran a weekly TV show on the Nine Network, featuring "music clips, interviews [and] the ARIA top 10", hosted by Jules Lund (replaced by David Whitehill circa early 2004) and Elysia Pratt.

Discography

Main series
Typically, So Freshs Autumn, Winter and Spring releases are a single CD, while the Summer releases are a two-CD set, mixing current hits with the "biggest hits" or "best" of the past year. From Autumn 2008 to Autumn 2016, the Autumn, Winter and Spring releases included a "bonus DVD" with music videos for selected songs from the CD (from Winter 2014 onwards, separate CD-only versions were also released). Since Summer 2015, the Summer albums have been released in both double-disc versions, and single-disc versions without the "best of".

Christmas releases

Other CD releases

DVD releases

References

External links
 

Compilation album series
So Fresh albums